During the 1992–93 English football season, Portsmouth F.C. competed in the Football League First Division. They ended up their season being 3rd in the first division league. Guy Whittingham was the top goal scorer for Portsmouth football club in that particular season. He scored 47 goals for them.

They reached the third round of FA Cup and League Cup. They lost to Brighton and Hove Albion in the FA Cup third round. Ipswich Town restricted Portsmouth Football Club's League Cup journey by winning against them.

First Division

First Division play-offs

FA Cup

League Cup

Anglo-Italian Cup

References

 

Portsmouth F.C. seasons
Portsmouth